The Steccherinaceae are a family of about 200 species of fungi in the order Polyporales. It includes crust-like, toothed, and poroid species that cause a white rot in dead wood.

Taxonomy
The family was circumscribed by Czech mycologist Erast Parmasto in 1968. Parmasto's original concept included species that are today classified in the Agaricales, Hymenochaetales, Polyporales, and Russulales. A large-scale molecular study published in 2012 by Otto Miettinen and colleagues redefined the limits of the Steccherinaceae to include most species of the poroid and hydnoid genera Antrodiella, Junghuhnia, and Steccherinum, as well as members of 12 other hydnoid and poroid genera. These genera were traditionally classified in the families Phanerochaetaceae, Polyporaceae, and Meruliaceae. They commented: "we see the need for at least 30 monophyletic, morphologically distinguishable genera. These include no fewer than 15 new genera for both polypores and hydnoid fungi, and revival of several unused genus names." In a subsequent 2016 publication coauthored with Leif Ryvarden, Miettinen circumscribed several new genera—Antella, Austeria, Butyrea, Citripora, and Trulla. In a 2017 phylogenetic overview of the Polyporales, Alfredo Justo and colleagues have noted "The extreme morphological variation within the Steccherinaceae makes it very difficult to characterize the family by means other than phylogeny and a certain predominance of morphological characters."

Walter Jülich created the family Mycorrhaphiaceae to contain the type genus Mycorrhaphium. This family is now placed in synonymy with Steccherinaceae.

Phylogenetics
The genus Xanthoporus and the Loweomyces clade occupy a basal position of the Steccherinaceae phylogenetic tree. The genus Antrodiella was found to be polyphyletic, containing species spread throughout 10 distinct clades in the Steccherinaceae. Although it is not known with certainty what the closest relatives of the Steccherinaceae  are, the genera Climacocystis, Hypochnicium, Meripilus, Podoscypha, and Pouzaroporia consistently appear close regardless of the gene used for phylogenetic analysis.

Species in the core Antrodiella clade are very close genetically, even between species with a rather different spore shape, suggesting that these taxa may be undergoing ongoing rapid speciation. In some cases, DNA evidence shows that two morphologically nearly identical Antrodiella species are more distantly related than species that have larger phenotypic differences.

Description
Most genera of the Steccherinaceae contain poroid or hydnoid fungi; Steccherinum contains both types. Steccherinaceae 
spores are usually broadly cylindrical or ellipsoid in shape. Characters useful for genus-level classification include fruit body colour and type, detailed hyphal structure, presence of cystidia, the strength of cyanophilic reactions of hyphae or spores, and the thickness of the spore walls. All species cause a white rot, and most grow on wood. Most of the species considered have a dimitic hyphal structure (containing both generative and skeletal hyphae), and most have clamps at the primary septa.

Genera

Antella Miettinen (2016); 3 species
Type: Antella niemelaei
Antrodiella  Ryvarden & I.Johans (1980); ~50 species
Type: Antrodiella semisupina
Atraporiella  Ryvarden (2007); 1 species
Type: Atraporiella neotropica
Austeria  Miettinen (2016); 1 species
Type: Austeria citrea
Butyrea  Miettinen (2016); 2 species
Type: Butyrea luteoalba
Cabalodontia  M.Piątek (2004); 5 species
Type: Cabalodontia queletii
Caudicicola Miettinen, M.Kulju & Kotir. (2017); 1 species
Type: Caudicicola gracilis
Chaetoporus  P.Karst (1890); 1 species
Type: Chaetoporus tenuis
Citropora  Miettinen (2016); 2 species
Type: Citripora bannaensis
Elaphroporia  Z.Q. Wu & C.L. Zhao (2018); 1 species
Type: Elaphroporia ailaoshanensis
Etheirodon  Banker (1902); 1 species
Type: Etheirodon fimbriatum
Flabellophora  G.Cunn (1965); ~20 species
Type: Flabellophora superposita
Flaviporus  Murrill (1905); 12 species
Type: Flaviporus rufoflavus
Frantisekia  Spirin and Zmitr (2007); 3 species
Type: Frantisekia fissiliformis
Junghuhnia  Corda (1842); 36 species
Type: Junghuhnia crustacea
Lamelloporus  Ryvarden (1987); 1 species
Type: Lamelloporus americanus
Loweomyces  (Kotl. & Pouzar) Julich (1982); 6 species
Type: Loweomyces fractipes
Metuloidea  G.Cunn (1965); 4 species
Type: Metuloidea tawa
Mycorrhaphium  Maas Geest (1962); 6 species
Type: Mycorrhaphium adustum
Nigroporus  Murrill (1905); 5 species
Type: Nigroporus vinosus
Steccherinum  Gray (1821); ~ 30 species
Type: Steccherinum ochraceum
Trulla  Miettinen & Ryvarden (2016); 5 species
Type: Trulla dentipora
Xanthoporus  Audet (2010); 2 species
Type: Xanthoporus peckianus

Several genera are speculated to belong to the Steccherinaceae, although they have not yet been sampled: Amaurohydnum, Columnodontia, Cystidiodendron, Irpicochaete, Melzerodontia, Mycoleptodonoides, and Odontiochaete. The genus Irpex has historically been placed in the Steccherinaceae, but its type species, Irpex lacteus, is more closely related to Byssomerulius in the Phanerochaetaceae. Irpex is now placed as the type genus of family Irpicaceae.

References

 
Steccherinaceae
Taxa described in 1968